Ketambea is a genus of Asian dwarf spiders that was first described by Alfred Frank Millidge & A. Russell-Smith in 1992.

Species
 it contains nine species, found in China, Indonesia, Japan, Korea, Myanmar, Russia, and Thailand:
Ketambea acuta Tanasevitch, 2017 – China, Myanmar, Thailand
Ketambea aseptifera Irfan, Zhang & Peng, 2022 – China
Ketambea falcata Irfan, Zhang & Peng, 2022 – China
Ketambea liupanensis (Tang & Song, 1992) – Russia (Far East), China
Ketambea nigripectoris (Oi, 1960) – Russia (Far East), China, Korea, Japan
Ketambea permixta Millidge & Russell-Smith, 1992 – Indonesia (Java)
Ketambea rostrata Millidge & Russell-Smith, 1992 (type) – Indonesia (Sumatra)
Ketambea septifera Irfan, Zhang & Peng, 2022 – China
Ketambea vermiformis Millidge & Russell-Smith, 1992 – Indonesia (Java)

See also
 List of Linyphiidae species (I–P)

References

Araneomorphae genera
Linyphiidae
Spiders of Asia